Iestyn Rees (born 5 October 1999) is a German-born Welsh rugby union player, currently playing for Pro14 and European Rugby Champions Cup side Scarlets. His preferred position is flanker.

Club career
Rees was named in the Scarlets first team squad ahead of the 2020–21 season. He made two further appearances during the tournament, coming off the bench against Cardiff and Edinburgh. Rees featured in a Scarlets Development XV friendly match against Ospreys A on 19 November 2021, starting as an openside flanker. His involvement with the Scarlets was limited after this, not appearing again until 10 March 2023, when he started in a friendly against the Saracens.

International career
In 2018, Rees was selected as captain of Wales U18.

Rees represented Wales U20 in the U20 Six Nations and World Rugby Under 20 Championship.

In 2022, Rees competed for Wales Sevens at the 2022 Rugby World Cup Sevens in Cape Town.

References

External links
itsrugby.co.uk profile
Scarlets profile

1999 births
Living people
Welsh rugby union players
Scarlets players
Rugby union flankers
Sportspeople from Paderborn